Modere Fernand "Mud" Bruneteau (November 28, 1914 – April 15, 1982) was a Canadian professional ice hockey forward who played for the Detroit Red Wings in the National Hockey League between 1935 and 1946. He was teammates for a time with his brother, Ed Bruneteau and later coached him on the Omaha Knights. Bruneteau scored the winning goal of the longest overtime game in 1936. With the Red Wings Bruneteau won the Stanley Cup three times: in 1936, 1937, and in 1943.

Playing career
Bruneteau is most famous for ending the longest game in NHL playoff history. A rookie, he had been called up to the Red Wings just two weeks earlier and was still trying to adjust to the pace of the NHL when he was thrown into his first playoff series. On March 24, 1936, at the Montreal Forum, against the Montreal Maroons, Mud scored the winning goal at 16:30 of the sixth overtime (116:30 of total overtime) to win the first game of the best-of-five series for Detroit, 1–0. Bruneteau batted a rolling puck past Maroons' goalie Lorne Chabot for the decisive score. Teammate Hec Kilrea was credited with an assist on the play. The game ended at 2:25 a.m. (the length of the game eclipsed the previous record of 104 minutes and 46 seconds of overtime set three years earlier in a 1933 series between the Toronto Maple Leafs and Boston Bruins). Detroit swept the series versus the Maroons in three straight games and went on to win the Stanley Cup. Bruneteau had his best season in 1943–44 when he scored 35 goals in 39 games in the 50-game NHL season.

After his playing career was over, he became a successful minor league coach, leading the Omaha Knights to a number of United States Hockey League championships.

He was suffering from cancer when he traveled to Houston, Texas for cancer treatment in April 1982. While there, he fell gravely ill and on died April 15, 1982.

Career statistics

Regular season and playoffs

See also
List of the longest NHL overtime games
List of NHL players who spent their entire career with one franchise

Awards and achievements
 Stanley Cup champion: (1936, 1937, and 1943)
 Honoured Member of the Manitoba Hockey Hall of Fame

External links

1914 births
1982 deaths
Canadian expatriate ice hockey players in the United States
Canadian ice hockey forwards
Detroit Olympics (IHL) players
Detroit Red Wings captains
Detroit Red Wings players
Franco-Manitoban people
Indianapolis Capitals players
Omaha Knights (USHL) players
People from Saint Boniface, Winnipeg
Pittsburgh Hornets players
Ice hockey people from Winnipeg
Stanley Cup champions
Winnipeg Columbus Club players
Winnipeg Falcons players